Orléans is an Appellation d'origine contrôlée (AOC) for wine in the Loire Valley wine region of France situated around the city of Orléans.

History

Contemporary history
This wine has held AOC status since September 2006. Prior to this date it held VDQS status, and the VDQS was renamed from Vins de l'Orléanais to Orléans in 2002. In the course of the 20th century, the Orléans wine-growing area went through a serious decline. Its accession to AOC status has come about thanks to the unstinting efforts of its producers over the last 20 years.

Geographical Location
The area lies in the Loiret department in the communes of Saint-Jean-de-la-Ruelle, Saint-Pryvé-Saint-Mesmin, Baule, Beaugency, Chécy, Cléry-Saint-André, Mardié, Mareau-aux-Prés, Meung-sur-Loire, Mézières-lez-Cléry, Olivet, Orléans, Saint-Ay, Saint-Hilaire-Saint-Mesmin and Saint-Jean-de-Braye.

Geology
Siliceous clay and siliceous gravel soils.

Climate
The climate is semi-oceanic with continental influences.

Orléans

Wine-growing area

Profile

Grape varieties
Pinot noir and Pinot Meunier are the varieties used to make red wine. White wines are made from Chardonnay grapes, which must constitute at least 60% of the total grapes used and can be blended with Pinot gris. In reality, however, only Chardonnay tend to be used. Rosé wines are made from two Pinot varieties, Pinot Meunier and Pinot noir.

Types of wines and gastronomy
The wines are generally straightforward, honest and fruity. They are made to be drunk within a relatively short time, between 2 and 5 years after bottling.

Notes and references

Bibliography 
 Michel Mastrojanni: Les Vins de France (guide vert solar).  Éditions Solar, Paris 1992 – 1994 – 1998.

Loire AOCs